is a Japanese politician of the Liberal Democratic Party, a member of the House of Representatives in the Diet (national legislature). A native of the former town of Kirishima, Kagoshima and graduate of Keio University, he was elected for the first time in 2005. He is affiliated to the revisionist lobby Nippon Kaigi.

Career
 Company Employee
 5 times elected to the House of Representatives (constituency: Kagoshima 3)
 State Minister of Cabinet Office
 State Minister of Environment
 Parliamentary Vice-Minister, Agriculture, Forestry and Fisheries
 Chief Director, Committee on Agriculture, Forestry and Fisheries, HR
 Director, Agriculture and Forestry Division, LDP
 Deputy Secretary-General, LDP

References 
 
 Profile on LDP website: jimin.jp/english/profile/members/114747.html

External links 
 Official website in Japanese.

Members of the House of Representatives (Japan)
Koizumi Children
Keio University alumni
Politicians from Kagoshima Prefecture
Living people
1958 births
Members of Nippon Kaigi
Liberal Democratic Party (Japan) politicians